Brighton is an unincorporated area in the town of Tonawanda in Erie County, New York, United States.

References

Hamlets in Erie County, New York
Hamlets in New York (state)